Pavlos Laskaris (born 19 March 1996) is a Greek professional footballer who plays as a defensive midfielder for Super League 2 club Athens Kallithea.

References

1996 births
Living people
Football League (Greece) players
Gamma Ethniki players
Fostiras F.C. players
Iraklis Thessaloniki F.C. players
AO Chania F.C. players
Veria F.C. players
Aiginiakos F.C. players
Trikala F.C. players
Olympiacos Volos F.C. players
Egaleo F.C. players
Association football midfielders
Footballers from Athens
Greek footballers